Anuppur tehsil is a fourth-order administrative and revenue division, a subdivision of third-order administrative and revenue division of Anuppur district of Madhya Pradesh. It contains the town of Anuppur.

Geography
Anuppur tehsil has an area of 597.38 sq kilometers. It is bounded by Shahdol district in the west, northwest and north, Kotma tehsil in the northeast, Chhattisgarh in the east and southeast, Jaithari tehsil in the south and Pushprajgarh tehsil in the southwest.

See also 
Anuppur district

References

External links

Tehsils of Madhya Pradesh
Anuppur district